Acts of Literature is a 1991 philosophical and literary book based on essays by the French philosopher Jacques Derrida. The book is the first collection of Derrida's essays on Western-culture literary texts. Derek Attridge edited the book in close association with Derrida himself.

Summary
Derrida discusses authors such as Jean-Jacques Rousseau, Stéphane Mallarmé, James Joyce, William Shakespeare, and Franz Kafka.

Influence
A part highly cited by scholars is the chapter dedicated to James Joyce: ‘Ulysses’ Gramophone: Hear Say Yes In Joyce. (pp. 253–309).

Editions
1st edition published by Routledge, November 20, 1991. .

References

Review by Nick Groom (1995) The Modern Language Review, Vol. 90, No. 3 (Jul., 1995), pp. 726–728 
Review by Wheeler, Kathleen M. Journal of European Studies,  September, 1993  
Burns, Christy (1999) Joyce's significance for Derrida  Novel: A Forum on Fiction,  Fall 1999
Roughley, ALAN (1999) Reading Derrida Reading Joyce (Gainesville: University Press of Florida, 1999), p. 176

 

1991 non-fiction books
Works by Jacques Derrida